Lawrence Kelly (19 November 1911 – 1979) was a Scottish professional footballer who played in the Football League for Aldershot, Southend United, Bristol City as a full back.

References 

English Football League players
Clapton Orient F.C. wartime guest players
Scottish footballers
Association football fullbacks
1911 births
1979 deaths
Footballers from Bellshill
St Anthony's F.C. players
Southend United F.C. players
Bristol City F.C. players
Aldershot F.C. players
Millwall F.C. wartime guest players
Port Vale F.C. wartime guest players